UCI most commonly refers to:

 University of California, Irvine, a public university in Irvine, California, United States
 Union Cycliste Internationale, the world governing body for the sport of cycling

UCI may also refer to:

 Uganda Cancer Institute, a cancer treatment and research institution in Kampala, Uganda
 Unified Configuration Interface, a set of scripts to unify and simplify the configuration  the OpenWrt operating system
 Union Correctional Institution, Florida, United States
 Unione Cinematografica Italiana, an Italian film company of the silent era
 Unit Compliance Inspection, a United States Air Force inspection
 UCI Cinemas (United Cinemas International), cinema company in Brazil, Germany, Italy and Portugal
 Universal Chess Interface, a communications protocol for chess game software
 Univision Communications Inc., the former name of the American subsidiary of media company TelevisaUnivision
 Unlawful command influence, a term in American military law